Benjamin Anthony Kozlowski (born August 16, 1980) is a former professional baseball left-handed pitcher. He previously played in Major League Baseball for the Texas Rangers and in Nippon Professional Baseball for the Hiroshima Toyo Carp.

Drafted by the Atlanta Braves in the 12th round of the 1999 MLB amateur draft, Kozlowski made his Major League Baseball debut with the Texas Rangers on September 19, 2002. He struck out John Olerud looking for his first Major League strikeout.

His 2003 season was cut short when he suffered a torn elbow ligament, necessitating Tommy John surgery.

Kozlowski returned to action in the middle of the 2004 season, but struggled, and was placed on waivers by the Rangers after the season.

Kozlowski was claimed off of waivers by the Cincinnati Reds.

He was traded from the Reds to the Los Angeles Dodgers for outfielder Cody Ross in May .

External links

Ben Kozlowski - mlb.com

1980 births
Living people
Texas Rangers players
Hiroshima Toyo Carp players
American expatriate baseball players in Japan
Baseball players from Florida
Major League Baseball pitchers
Gulf Coast Braves players
Macon Braves players
Myrtle Beach Pelicans players
Charlotte Rangers players
Tulsa Drillers players
Frisco RoughRiders players
Stockton Ports players
Louisville Bats players
Chattanooga Lookouts players
Las Vegas 51s players
Jacksonville Suns players
Scranton/Wilkes-Barre Yankees players
Somerset Patriots players
Sugar Land Skeeters players
American people of Polish descent
Junior college baseball players in the United States
Estrellas Orientales players
American expatriate baseball players in the Dominican Republic
Charros de Jalisco players
American expatriate baseball players in Mexico
Cañeros de Los Mochis players
Criollos de Caguas players
American expatriate baseball players in Venezuela
Águilas del Zulia players